Hazarika was a Paik officer under the administration of the Ahom kingdom and Koch kingdom. The commander over 1,000 (Hazar) paiks was known as a Hazarika. As it was a purely administrative position, the title holder could belong to diverse ethnic groups.

The surname mostly belongs to the Ahom, Chutia and Koch ethnic groups. Apart from the Ahom Hazarikas, there is mention of Chutia Hazarikas in several instances of Buranjis. For example, during the reign of the Ahom king Susenphaa, the Banrukia Hazarika was of Chutia origins. At the start of the Moamoria rebellion, Kirtichandra Barbarua first sent a force led by a Chutia Hazarika to fight the rebels, who was killed in the battle. During the Dafala invasion of 1672 AD, a Chutia Hazarika was involved in the battle with the Dafalas. After the fall of the Chutia kingdom, Hazarikas were appointed among Chutia blacksmiths and other guilds to look after the works.

Hazarika was also an administrative position in the Koch army. There is mention of a Koch Hazarika in wars against the Ahoms.

Previously, the surname was also written by some Sonowal Kacharis, but it was later replaced by the Sonowal surname. The Kaibarta people have this surname.

Notable Hazarika people
Jogendra Nath Hazarika, Indian politician, Chief Minister of Assam
Bhupen Hazarika, Indian playback singer, lyricist, musician, singer, poet and film-maker
Bagh Hazarika, 17th century figure from Assam
Atul Chandra Hazarika (1903–1986), Assamese litterateur from Assam. ...
Mrinal Hazarika
Balaram Hazarika, Assamese animal tracker
Pritam Hazarika (born 1969), Indian cricketer
Debananda Hazarika, Indian politician
Dhruba Hazarika (born 1956), Indian novelist
Diganta Hazarika, actor
Ayesha Hazarika, British/Scottish broadcaster/journalist and political commentator (and former adviser)

See also

Assamese people

References

Bibliography

Indian surnames
Assamese-language surnames
Ahom kingdom